Christopher Hamrick (born October 21, 1966) is an American professional wrestler. He is best known for his stint in ECW, though he is also known for his appearances in WWE, TNA and throughout the independent circuit.

Professional wrestling career

Early career
Hamrick began watching wrestling as a child. He made his professional debut at the age of sixteen in a promotion operated by his father, facing Alvin Melton in Mooresboro, North Carolina. Hamrick wrestled on the independent circuit for several years.

In 1994, Hamrick wrestled several televised matches as an enhancement talent for the World Wrestling Federation, working with the likes of Razor Ramon, Owen Hart, Billy Gunn, Jeff Jarrett and others.

Although he did not win many matches at the big time level, he did in the independent circuit. Hamrick went to the IWWA, often to team up with Tommy "Wildfire" Rich and had memorable matches against Rock Parsons and Ivan Koloff. Later he teamed up with Rock to go against Lord Zoltan and Chief Jay Eagle
. Hamrick went on to wrestle for Smoky Mountain Wrestling before returning to the independent circuit.

Extreme Championship Wrestling (2000–2001)
Hamrick wrestled a tryout match with Extreme Championship Wrestling on May 25, 2000 in Columbia, South Carolina, and remained with the promotion until it declared bankruptcy in April 2001. In ECW, Hamrick was known as "Confederate Currency" Chris Hamrick and was part of the stable known as Hot Commodity with EZ Money, Elektra and Julio Dinero.

Back to the independent circuit (2002–present)
In 2002, Hamrick made several appearances with Total Nonstop Action Wrestling, wrestling under a mask as the luchadore character Crimson Dragon. In 2002 and 2003, he frequently wrestled for Xtreme Pro Wrestling, where he formed a tag team with Tracy Smothers known as Southern Comfort, also having a long-running feud for the TV title with Kaos and The Enterprise.

In 2003, Hamrick toured the UK with Frontier Wrestling Alliance. He won the All-England Championship after defeating the Zebra Kid, later on he lost the championship to Jonny Storm. In 2006 he returned to work in the UK, this time Hamrick worked full time for One Pro Wrestling.

On 28 July 2005, Hamrick returned to work for WWE in an episode of WWE SmackDown, he wrestled for the tag team championships when he teamed up with Chuck Szili in a losing effort against Heidenreich & Road Warrior Animal. In early 2006 he worked two matches on WWE Heat.
On the August 20, 2007, episode of WWE Raw, Hamrick made an appearance as a fake version of Triple H, in which he placed a crown on King Booker's head during a royal ceremony, leading up to Booker's match with Triple H at SummerSlam.

Hamrick was featured on Wrestling Society X's first episode on MTV, getting into an argument with fellow ECW alumni New Jack, then getting eliminated by him in the WSX Rumble later that night. Despite both of them getting eliminated from the bout, Hamrick took an elbow drop from New Jack off the top of a truckbed through a table. At HCW: Beg 4 Mercy 2007 in April, Hamrick returned to Mooresboro, NC and defeated New Jack in an Extreme Weapons Match. Three months later, Hamrick won the HCW Triple Crown Championship after defeating Axl Knight, Wicked, and Shea Shea McGrady in a Four Way Dance at HCW's Cold Blooded and hardcore event. In March 2008, Hamrick was stripped of the title. On June 14 at Underground Revolution 2008, Hamrick defeated the current champion, Shea Shea McGrady, to reclaim the title.

One of his most recent matches took place in February 2015 in Mid Atlantic Championship Wrestling. Hamrick lost to Johnny Swinger.

On December 29, 2018, Hamrick was involved in a War Games style match for the Eastern Wrestling Federation in Forest City, NC. The stipulations for the match stated that if Hamrick’s team won, a competitor by the name of Chase Lovelace (of the opposing team) would leave the company, but if Hamrick’s team lost, Hamrick would leave the company. Ultimately, Hamrick’s team lost and he was forced to leave the company.

Professional wrestling style and persona
He used "Good Ol' Boys" by Waylon Jennings as his theme song.

Championships and accomplishments 
All Pro Wrestling
APW Heavyweight Championship (1 time)
APW Tag Team Championship (1 time) - with Dave Jericho
All-Star Championship Wrestling
ACW Heavyweight Championship (2 times)
ACW Light Heavyweight Championship (1 time)
ACW Tag Team Championship (1 time)
Appalachia Pro Wrestling
APW Tag Team Championship (1 time) - with Mike Preston 
Assault Championship Wrestling
ACW Heavyweight Championship (1 time)
Big Time Wrestling
BTW Heavyweight Championship (1 time)
Champions With Attitudes Pro Wrestling
CWA Cruiserweight Championship (1 time)
CWA Carolinas Championship (1 time)
Cleveland All-Pro Wrestling
CAPW North American Tag Team Championship (1 time) - with Julio Dinero
CAPW Unified Heavyweight Championship (2 times)
Delaware Championship Wrestling
DCW International Heavyweight Championship (1 time)
Fantasy Pro-Wrestling Federation
FPWF United States Junior Heavyweight Championship (2 times)
FPWF United States Tag Team Championship (1 time) - with Jeff Hamrick
Frontier Wrestling Alliance
FWA All-England Championship (1 time)
Hardcore Championship Wrestling
HCW Triple Crown Championship (2 times)
Heritage Wrestling Alliance
HWA Tri-States Championship (1 time)
Independent Wrestling Association Mid-South
IWA Mid-South Tag Team Championship (1 time) - with Tracy Smothers
International Wrestling Cartel
IWC Tag Team Championship (2 times) - with Tracy Smothers
MainStream Wrestling Entertainment
MSWE Heavyweight Championship (1 time)
NWA Mid-Atlantic Championship Wrestling
NWA Mid-Atlantic Hardcore Championship (1 time)
NWA Mid-Atlantic Junior Heavyweight Championship (2 times)
National Wrestling Alliance
NWA Ohio Tag Team Championship (1 time)
New Era Pro Wrestling
NEPW Triple Crown Championship (3 times)
Pro Wrestling Illustrated
PWI ranked him #203 of the top 500 singles wrestlers in 2003
Premier Wrestling Federation
PWF Universal Championship (1 time)
PWF Light Heavyweight Championship (1 time)
Pro Wrestling Federation
PWF Eastern States Championship (1 time)
PWF Southeastern Championship (1 time)
PWF Tag Team Championship (2 times) - with Ripper
Union of Independent Pro Wrestlers
UIPW Heavyweight Championship (1 time)
United States Wrestling Federation
USWF Heavyweight Championship (1 time)
Other titles
CCW Tag Team Championship (1 time)
EPW Tag Team Championship (1 time)
EWF Tag Team Championship (1 time)
RPW Tag Team Championship (1 time)
SCW Tag Team Championship (1 time)
SWA Tag Team Championship (1 time)

References

External links 
 

1966 births
American male professional wrestlers
Living people
People from Cleveland County, North Carolina
Professional wrestlers from North Carolina